is a Rinzai Zen Buddhist temple in located in the town of Matsushima, Miyagi Prefecture, Japan. Belonging to the  Myōshin-ji-branch of Rinzai Zen, it was founded in 828 during the Heian period by Jikaku Daishi.

History
The temple was founded as a Tendai sect temple by order of Emperor Junna. However, written records from this time are scarce. During the late Nara period and early Heian period, after the establishment of a centralized government under the Ritsuryō system, the Yamato court sent a number of military expeditions to what is now the Tōhoku region of northern Japan to bring the local Emishi tribes under its control. Numerous temples were built in the region at this time, many of which are attributed to Jikaku Daishi. The temple was patronised by the Northern Fujiwara clan, and priests from Zuigan-ji met with Minamoto no Yoshitsune, and also with Minamoto no Yoritomo during his campaign to destroy the Northern Fujiwara at Hiraizumi.

During the Kamakura period, under the sponsorship of Hōjō Tokimune, the temple changed from Tendai to Zen, with Rankei Dōryū has its head priest and came to a patronised by the samurai class. During the Edo period, it was rebuilt by Date Masamune from 1604 onwards using lumber brought from Mount Kumano in what is now  Wakayama Prefecture and skilled workmen from Kyoto and Kii Province. The haiku poet Matsuo Bashō wrote a tribute to the golden walls inside the temple. The Date clan of Sendai Domain continued to support the temple until the Meiji Restoration.

Hondō (Hōjō), the main building, which was completed in 1609, measures 39 meters by 25.2 meters and houses the principal Buddhist image. Many parts of the temple have been designated as natural treasures and important cultural assets.

Due to its protected location in Matsushima Bay, the temple escaped severe damage during the 2011 Tōhoku earthquake and tsunami, although there was some damage to the gardens.

Zuigan-ji also features a number of caves carved into the rock.  These caves were used for memorial services and as a cinerarium to house the ashes of the deceased.  The caves were constructed in the Kamakura period and remained in use until the Edo period.

The temple grounds also contain the Zuigan-ji Art Museum established on October 1, 1995, to display various artifacts, including calligraphy by former head monks, fusuma paintings, tea cups and portraits.

Important cultural artifacts
 Hondō (Hōjō), built in 1609, National Treasure
 Temple kitchen (kuri) and associated cloister, National Treasure
 Godai-do altar, ICP
 Godai-Myoo statues (wooden, 5 statues), ICP
 Hondo fusuma (161 screens), ICP
 Middle Gate, ICP
 Onarimon Gate, ICP
 Umban (gong), ICP

See also 
 Glossary of Japanese Buddhism.

References

Sources

External links

  

828 establishments
9th-century establishments in Japan
Religious organizations established in the 9th century
Myoshin-ji temples
Buddhist temples in Miyagi Prefecture
National Treasures of Japan
Important Cultural Properties of Japan
Matsushima, Miyagi